The TIM Music Awards, known between 2007–2013 and 2015–2018 as Wind Music Awards and between 2019 and 2021 as SEAT Music Awards are non-competitive music awards honoring Italian music artists who have sold a certain number of copies of an album, digital song, or music DVD over the previous year in Italy, as certified by the Federazione Industria Musicale Italiana. The awards are organized by Milan-based agency Friends & Partners, and held since 2007 as a replacement of the canceled Italian Music Awards (2001–2003).

Their previous name was dependent on the sponsorship of Italian phone company Wind. In 2014 they were officially known as just Music Awards while between 2019 and 2021 they have been sponsored by SEAT.
From 2022 it is sponsored by TIM.

History 
From 2007 to 2009, the awards were held in Rome, first in the Auditorium Conciliazione and then in the Valle Giulia. Since 2009, the event has been held in the Verona Arena, previously home to the Festivalbar, for which the Wind Music Awards has been seen as a replacement. The first five years of the awards were broadcast on television network Italia 1; they have been broadcast on Rai 1 since 2012. The event has also been broadcast on radio station RTL 102.5.

The awards have been criticized in the past by Italian indie label Produttori Musicali Indipendenti for excluding independent artists.

Awards 
Based on:

Years

Compilation albums

References

External links
 Official website

Italian music television series
Italian music awards